Duncan McKenzie (born 1950) is an English footballer.

Duncan McKenzie may also refer to:

 Duncan McKenzie (footballer, born 1912) (1912–1987), Scottish international footballer (Albion Rovers, Brentford and Middlesbrough)
 Duncan McKenzie (murderer) (1951–1995), American murderer executed by lethal injection in Montana
 Duncan McKenzie (writer) (born 1960), English-born Canadian television writer

See also
 Duncan Mackenzie (1861–1934), Scottish archaeologist